Frances S. Klock (January 1, 1844 – October 6, 1908) was an American politician in the state of Colorado.

Legislative career
Colorado became the first state in which women obtained the right to vote through popular election on January 7, 1893.  The following year, on November 6, 1894, three women were elected to serve in the Colorado House of Representatives. Besides Frances Klock, they included Clara Cressingham and Carrie C. Holly.  All three were Republicans and were sworn into office in 1895. Each served one term, from 1895 to 1896.

References

External links
Colorado Encyclopedia: "Frances Klock" by Judy Gaughan.

Members of the Colorado House of Representatives
1844 births
1908 deaths
19th-century American politicians